Luís Jorge Pinto da Silva (born 4 December 1975) is a Portuguese former professional footballer who played mainly as a defensive midfielder.

He amassed Primeira Liga totals of 127 matches and one goal over nine seasons, mainly in representation of Boavista for whom he also appeared at other levels.

Club career
Silva was born in Porto. Having emerged from local Boavista FC's youth ranks he was promoted to the first team in 1994, but took time to establish himself in the early years, serving two loans until 1998 (Académica de Coimbra and U.D. Leiria, both in the second division).

Silva returned to Boavista subsequently, and went on to be a relatively important part in the club's historical Primeira Liga conquest in 2000–01, assuming defensive duties in midfield with Petit. He featured heavily as the Axadrezados progressed to the following season's UEFA Champions League second group stage, adding a semi-final run in the UEFA Cup the next year.

Starting in January 2005, Silva then played two and a half years at S.C. Beira-Mar, being relegated from the top flight in his last, after which he moved to C.D. Feirense also in the second level. In 2008, he returned to Boavista as the last survivor of the league-winning squad, as the club was in a severe financial crisis in division two, ultimately being relegated for the second consecutive time.

In summer 2010, at nearly 35, Silva signed with another northern team, Gondomar S.C. of the third tier. He retired in June of the following year, beginning a coaching career immediately as he was appointed assistant manager at F.C. Paços de Ferreira.

International career
In 2002, the year after Boavista's league conquest, Silva collected two caps for Portugal. He made his debut on 7 September, coming on as a late substitute in a 1–1 friendly draw against England at Villa Park.

Personal life
Silva's sons, Fábio and Jorge, are also professional footballers. Both were developed at Porto.

Honours
Boavista
Primeira Liga: 2000–01

Beira-Mar
Segunda Liga: 2005–06

References

External links

1975 births
Living people
Portuguese footballers
Footballers from Porto
Association football midfielders
Association football utility players
Primeira Liga players
Liga Portugal 2 players
Segunda Divisão players
Boavista F.C. players
Associação Académica de Coimbra – O.A.F. players
U.D. Leiria players
S.C. Beira-Mar players
C.D. Feirense players
Gondomar S.C. players
Portugal youth international footballers
Portugal under-21 international footballers
Portugal B international footballers
Portugal international footballers
Portuguese football managers
A.D. Nogueirense managers